The 2013 Judo Grand Prix Abu Dhabi was held in Abu Dhabi, United Arab Emirates from 22 to 23 November 2013.

Medal summary

Men's events

Women's events

Source Results

Medal table

References

External links
 

2013 IJF World Tour
2013 Judo Grand Prix
Judo
Grand Prix Abu Dhabi 2013
Judo
Judo